Ee (sometimes appearing as ee, EE, or eE) is an American, San Francisco-based indie rock band, that formed in 1999 by former Korea Girl guitarist/vocalist Tobin Mori and bassist Jay Chow/Che Chou. Earlier band members included Brian Gathy, Peter Newman, Susan Parker, and Thom Morrison, and were later replaced by Peter Nguyen on drums, and longtime Seam member Sooyoung Park on lead guitar and keyboard. All members of Ee are Asian-American.

They recorded their debut album, Ramadan, in the fall of 1999 and released it on Currycore Records. After some lineup changes Ee released an EP and second album second album, For 100 We Try Harder, on Asian Man Records in 2002.

Discography
Ramadan (2001, Curry Records)
Tinyspot EP (2002, Asian Man Records)
For 100 We Try Harder (2002, Asian Man Records)
Capital Plans (2006, Actually, Records)

References

External links
 [ Entry for Ee at Allmusic.com]
 Ee on Myspace
 "Ee: Another Asian Gangster Band? Tobin Mori talks about Showbiz and Indie Rock." Asianweek.com (March 9–15, 2001)
 "Interview with Ee: Rock'n'Roll by 'Model Minority' " Koreanpop.org (June, 2002)
 Mori's new shoegaze collaboration, Skycamp 

Indie rock musical groups from California
Musical groups established in 1999
Musical groups from San Francisco
Asian Man Records artists
1999 establishments in California